The Malaita fantail (Rhipidura malaitae) is a fantail endemic to Malaita in the Solomon Islands.

References

External links
BirdLife Species Factsheet

Malaita fantail
Birds of Malaita
Malaita fantail